Bank of London may refer to:

 The Bank of London, clearing bank established 2021
 Bank of London and the Middle East, established 2006
 Bank of London and South America, 1923–1971
 Bank of London and Montreal, 1958–1984